Ebo Creek is a stream in Washington County in the U.S. state of Missouri. It is a tributary of Fourche a Renault.

The stream flows south and then east to pass under Missouri Route 185 just south of the community of Ebo. The stream continues to the east-northeast to its confluence with the Fourche a Renault about one mile south of the community of Aptus.

It is unknown why the name "Ebo" was applied to this stream. The French explored the area for mining potential in the early 1700s, and a mine called the Ebo Lead Mines is located in the area.

See also
List of rivers of Missouri

References

Rivers of Washington County, Missouri
Rivers of Missouri